Virodhi is a 2011 Telugu-language film directed by G. Neelakanta Reddy. The film stars Srikanth, Kamalinee Mukherjee, Ajay and Kamal Kamaraju in pivotal roles. The film was showcased among the Indian panorama section, at the 2011 International Film Festival of India. The film won two Nandi Awards. The film was later dubbed in Hindi as Apradh Ke Aatank in 2013 by Goldmines Telefilms.

Plot
Political journalist Jayadev (Srikanth) unearths several scams made by a politician (Ahuti Prasad) who in turn invites him to bribe him. The idealistic Jayadev refuses to relent, and as they discuss, a group of Naxals attack the politician and kill him off while Jayadev is taken hostage. Along with Jayadev, the group of Maoists led by Gogi (Ajay) head to their base camp in a dense forest. During the journey, their ideologies are tested; good and bad are exposed, in a dramatic way.

Cast
 Srikanth as Jayadev
 Kamalinee Mukherjee as Sunitha
 Ajay as Gogi
 Kamal Kamaraju as Hari
 Kiran Varanasi as Ganesh
 Sri Ramya as Myna
 Ravi Varma as Lakhsman
 Sivaji Raja
 Ahuti Prasad as Political Leader
 Nagineedu as Commissioner
 Moinuddin Mohammed as Karthik, Assistant Commissioner of Police
 Rathna Shekar Reddy as Police Officer

Soundtrack 
"Adivamma Vesinadi"
"Edi Cheekati Edi Veluturu"

Reception 
A critic from The Times of India rated the film 3.5 out of 5 and wrote that "A far cry from all the commercial fare that is being doled out these days, “Virodhi” is an intelligent flick. Neelakantha is the true star of this movie for his efforts to pull of something like this". Jeevi of Idlebrain.com opined that "Director Neelakanta who has come up with engaging screenplay for films like Show and Missamma couldn’t handle in this film with interesting screenplay".

Awards
Nandi Awards
Third Best Feature Film - Bronze - Anil Meka
Best Dialogue Writer - Neelakanta

References

External links

2011 films
2010s Telugu-language films
Films about Naxalism
Indian crime films
Films about journalists
Films about journalism
Films about terrorism in India
2011 crime films